"Bounce" is a song by the American hip hop record producer and rapper Timbaland, taken from his second studio album, Shock Value. It was released as a promotional single in the US on February 8, 2008. It was used in the soundtrack of Step Up 2: The Streets. It has a chorus from Justin Timberlake and rap verses from Dr. Dre and Missy Elliott. It peaked at #93 on the Billboard Hot 100. The song uses an uncredited sample of the song "Dirty Talk" by Klein + M.B.O.

References 

Timbaland songs
2007 songs
Songs written by Missy Elliott
Songs written by Timbaland
Songs written by Justin Timberlake